Marko Pavićević (born 8 May 2001) is a Serbian professional basketball player for FMP of the Basketball League of Serbia.

Early career 
Pavićević started to play basketball for his hometown team Vizura. In summer 2017, Pavićević was added to the Crvena zvezda youth team. Pavićević won the second place at the 2018–19 Junior ABA League season with the Zvezda. Over seven-season games, he averaged 6.4 points, 3.6 rebounds and 1.7 assists per game.

Professional career 
In April 2019, Pavićević was loaned out to FMP of the Basketball League of Serbia. On 27 April, he made his Serbian League debut against Zlatibor, making 2 points in under 3 minutes of playing time. On 8 June 2019, Pavićević signed a multi-year contract for Crvena zvezda. On 4 September 2019, he was loaned to Tamiš for the 2019–20 BLS season. On 17 September 2020, Pavićević signed his first professional contract with FMP. On 2 October 2020, he was loaned to Tamiš.

National team career
Pavićević was a member of the Serbian under-16 national team that won the bronze medal at the 2017 FIBA Europe Under-16 Championship in Montenegro. Over seven tournament games, he averaged 6.9 points, 3.1 rebounds and 0.3 assists per game. Pavićević was a member of the Serbian under-17 team that participated at the 2018 FIBA Under-17 Basketball World Cup in Argentina. Over three tournament games, he averaged 1.3 points, 1.3 rebounds and 0.3 assists per game.

Personal life 
His older brother Filip (born 1999) is a basketball player for San Severo of the Serie A2. Filip played for Italian clubs Orlandina, Scafati and Teramo.

References

External links 
 Profile at eurobasket.com
 Profile at euroleague.net
 Profile at realgm.com
 Profile at ABA League

2001 births
Living people
ABA League players
Basketball League of Serbia players
Basketball players from Belgrade
Centers (basketball)
KK Crvena zvezda youth players
KK FMP players
KK Tamiš players
Power forwards (basketball)
Serbian men's basketball players